Duke of Aliaga is a hereditary title in the Peerage of Spain, accompanied by the dignity of Grandee and granted in 1487 by Ferdinand II to Juan Fernández de Híjar, Count of Aliaga, Duke of Híjar and later also Duke of Lécera.

It is one of the highest titles of Spanish nobility associated with one of the members of the Grandes de España. The title was created in 1487 by King Ferdinand II of Aragón (el Catolico) who raised the County of Aliaga to the status of a Dukedom. The title was created as a favor to Juan Fernández de Híjar y Cabrera who had been previously appointed as Count of Aliaga on 31 December 1461 by Ferdinand's father, John II of Aragon.

Aliaga is a municipality in the Province of Teruel, Aragon.

The title of Count of Aliaga, along with a title of lordship over Castellote, was granted to Juan Fernández by John II as a compensation and restitution bonus after peace was made in a war for power between Carlos de Viana, King John II's son and the king. Juan Fernández had fought on the side of the king's illegitimate son.

Juan Fernández de Híjar y Cabrera was the son of Juan Fernández de Híjar, the fifth Baron of Hijar and first lord of Lécera (title which he purchased). His mother was Juan Fernandez' second wife, Timbor de Cabrera, daughter of Bernardo de Cabrera, first Count of Módica, XXIV Viscount of Cabrera, XXVI Viscount of Bas, and II Viscount of Osuna.

The title over the Dukedom of Aliaga has been carried consistently for almost five centuries, having been almost 400 years under the control of the House of Híjar. As such, the Dukedom of Híjar and the Dukedom of Lécera have also traditionally been associated with title over Aliaga.  These titles were separated after the reign of 12th Duke, José Rafael de Silva y Fernández de Híjar in 1863 who became the last Híjar to hold the title.

Dukes of Aliaga

References

Sources
 

Aliaga y Castellot
Grandees of Spain